Eretmocera florifera is a moth of the family Scythrididae first described by Edward Meyrick in 1909. This species is known from South Africa.

Adults have been recorded in wing in October and December.

References

Endemic moths of South Africa
florifera
Moths described in 1909